The African Airlines Association ( French: Association des Compagnies Aériennes Africaines), abbreviated AFRAA, is a trade association of African airlines. AFRAA was founded in Accra, Ghana, in 1968, and is, as of February 2021, headquartered in Nairobi, Kenya. The primary purpose of AFRAA is to establish and facilitate co-operation between African airlines.

The formation of the African Airlines Association was the result of historic developments and economic imperatives. In the early 1960s, a great number of African States acceded to independence and created their own national airlines. Most of these airlines became members of the International Air Transport Association.

AFRAA had its conceptual beginning in 1963, when a number of African airlines, taking the opportunity provided by the IATA Annual General Meeting (AGM) began holding consultation meetings prior to the IATA AGMs to discuss matters of interest to African airlines and to adopt common positions. This was the first step towards the creation of AFRAA. From that first step in Rome in 1963, the establishment in 1968 in Accra, of a regional organisation for the articulation of regional views and promotion of co-operation was undertaken by 14 founding members.

Objectives 
AFRAA as an association has the following strategic objectives:

 Safe, secure and reliable air transport;

Promote the industry best practices to support safe, secure and reliable air transport in Africa

 Enhance the visibility, reputation and influence of African Airlines in the global aviation  industry;
 Sustainable air transport;

Advocate for the reduction of costs of air transport services in Africa by reducing taxes, fees and charges

Strive for the implementation of cost-effective Human Resource Development

Lobby for market access to increase revenues and enhance connectivity for the aviation sector in Africa

 Cooperation;

Undertake the implementation of joint initiatives aimed at reducing operating costs for airlines, increase revenues and market share

Facilitate and encourage partnership among African airlines

 Data intelligence;

Become a hub for data, intelligence and expertise on the African Aviation Industry

Organs 

 The General Assembly

The highest policy making body of the Association is the Annual General Assembly composed of Chief Executives of member airlines. The Annual General Assembly is presided over by the President of the Association. The President of the Association rotates annually.

 The Executive Committee

The Executive Committee, composed of 11 members elected on a sub-regional basis among Chief Executives and ex-officio members with voting rights who are members of the IATA Board of Governors, exercises executive authority. Its function is to ensure supervision of the affairs, funds and property of the Association and formulation and determination of policies within the framework of Articles of Association, By-Laws and Resolutions adopted by the General Assembly.

 The Secretariat

The Secretariat serves as the administrative, co-ordination and research centre for the association. It is headed by a secretary general who is responsible for managing the day-to-day activities of the association. The current Secretary General is Mr. Abderahmane Berthe.

Steering Committees and Projects 
AFRAA provides a forum through which member airlines meet to develop and consolidate common approach to key issues in the aviation industry.

AFRAA members 
Any African Airline operating air services in the carriage of passengers and or cargo and meets the eligibility criteria may apply for membership as an Active or Associate member. The following is a list of the current AFRAA members.

AFRAA partners 
Besides membership contributions to the association, AFRAA has partners, who also support the activities of the association through financial contributions and sponsorship of specific projects and programmes. Currently there are a number of companies including aircraft and engine manufacturers and other airlines service providers registered under the partnership programme. The aim of the partnership programme is to pool together the much needed additional support from industry-related organizations whilst enabling the partners to benefit from a relationship with an efficient, knowledgeable and influential air transport trade association in Africa.

The AFRAA Partnership programme is open to all industry-related organisations that are interested in participating in the development of air transport in Africa. The programme aims to pool together resources and support from industry service providers while enabling partners to benefit from a relationship with a continental air transport trade organisation. Interested companies may apply for either full partnership or associate partnership of AFRAA.

See also 

 Airlines of Africa
 List of airlines of Africa

References

External links 
 AFRAA official website
 AFRAA news from the Pan African News Agency
  AFRAA news from the Pan African News Agency

Airline trade associations
Airlines of Africa
Civil aviation in Africa
Organizations established in 1968
1968 establishments in Ghana
Nairobi